The women's 60 metres event at the 2013 European Athletics Indoor Championships was held at March 2, 2013 at 13:35 (round 1), March 3, 16:30 (semi-final) and March 3, 18:15 (final) local time.

Records

Results

Round 1
Qualification: First 4 (Q) and the 4 fastest athletes (q) advanced to the semifinals.

Semifinals

Qualification: First 4 (Q) advanced to the final.

Final
The final was held at 18:15. The initial winner of the final, Tezdzhan Naimova, tested positive for the banned steroid drostanolone during the competition. In September 2013, she was officially stripped of her 2013 European Indoor Championships 60m title and banned for life from athletics. Ukraine's Mariya Ryemyen, who came second in the Gothenburg final, was declared the gold medalist of the 60m event, with France's Myriam Soumaré taking the silver medal and Bulgaria's Ivet Lalova the bronze.

References 

60 metres at the European Athletics Indoor Championships
2013 European Athletics Indoor Championships
2013 in women's athletics